Sarah Louise Green is a British businesswoman and Liberal Democrat politician who has been the Member of Parliament (MP) for Chesham and Amersham since the 2021 Chesham and Amersham by-election. Green is the first Liberal Democrat to represent the constituency, which had previously been Conservative since its creation in 1974. She is the area’s first non-Conservative representative since 1923.

Early life and education
Green grew up in Corwen, Clwyd in rural North Wales, where her family is from. She studied at Aberystwyth University and Manchester Metropolitan University. She was the chair of IR Cymru (now Welsh Young Liberals) during her time at Aberystwyth. She speaks Welsh fluently.

Early career
Green founded the marketing and communications company Green and Ginger in 2014. Her previous experience included working for Euromonitor International and Kantar TNS.

Green was selected as the Lib Dem candidate for the Ynys Môn constituency for the 2005 general election. She finished fifth behind the Labour, Plaid Cymru and Conservative candidates, as well as one independent. She next contested Arfon at the 2010 general election, where she finished fourth behind the Plaid Cymru, Labour and Conservative candidates.

In 2019, Green worked on Dominic Grieve's general election campaign.

Parliamentary career
On 4 April 2021, Dame Cheryl Gillan, former Secretary of State for Wales in the coalition government and MP for Chesham and Amersham since 1992, died from cancer. Subsequently, Green was elected as MP for the seat at the June 2021 by-election, with 21,517 votes (56.7%) – a majority of 8,028 (21.2%) on a swing of 25.2% from the Conservatives to the Lib Dems. Green is only the third MP to represent the constituency in its 47-year history, and is the constituency's second consecutive Welsh-born MP.

Leader of the Liberal Democrats, Ed Davey, who visited the seat 16 times during their campaign, celebrated the by-election victory by claiming the "Tory Blue Wall" across the south of England was "beginning to crumble". Liberal Democrat activists on the ground said many voters they had met on the doorstep felt neglected by the governing Conservative Party.

In her victory speech, Green called on voters to "reject Conservative mismanagement" and vowed to "continue the work of holding this Government to account for letting Covid rip through the care homes. We will speak up for the three million people excluded from financial support throughout the pandemic and we will challenge Boris Johnson to be far more ambitious in tackling climate change, supporting our frontline workers and backing our small businesses." She was sworn into Parliament on 21 June 2021, and made her maiden speech on 7  September 2021.

On 11 July 2022, Green was appointed Liberal Democrat Spokesperson for International Trade and Liberal Democrat Spokesperson for Wales.

Policy positions

HS2 Railway Line

Like her predecessor and her rival Conservative candidate, Green opposes the construction of the HS2 railway line that is planned to go through her constituency (work on the Chiltern tunnel started in May 2021). The day after the by-election, party leader Ed Davey was challenged on BBC Radio 4's Today programme on how his party's support for HS2 fitted with Green's stated opposition to the project. The local party campaigned against HS2, despite the national party giving the project their full backing at the 2019 general election. Davey said the party is still in favour of the project but that they would be a "thorn in the side" of the delivery company HS2 Ltd. "We still have problems with the way the HS2 company are going about their business – they have ignored local people." Davey added that challenging HS2 Ltd was a "mature approach... Standing up to big companies like HS2 rather than what the Conservatives seem to be doing and letting them rip." He accused the company of ignoring local people's concerns over issues such as the transparency of the impact of the Chilterns tunnelling works on local water supplies.

Planning laws
Green opposed the changes to England's planning laws that were proposed by the Conservative government in 2021  which she claimed would "see more unwanted destruction to our countryside", "allow developers to build over our greenbelt with local residents powerless to stop them", and "be a devastating blow to our area".  These plans were subsequently dropped by the government later that year in response to reaction amongst Conservatives MPs across the South-East who feared for their own electoral chances following Green's election.  Planning reform remains a contentious issue across the South-East especially in Green belt areas.

References

External links 
 
 

Living people
21st-century British businesswomen
21st-century British women politicians
Alumni of Aberystwyth University
Alumni of Manchester Metropolitan University
British marketing people
Female members of the Parliament of the United Kingdom for English constituencies
Liberal Democrats (UK) MPs for English constituencies
People from Buckinghamshire
People from Corwen
Politicians from Denbighshire
UK MPs 2019–present
Welsh-speaking politicians
Welsh women in politics
1982 births